This is a list of the roughly 150 species in the genus Geocoris, big-eyed bugs.

Geocoris species

 Geocoris acuticeps Signoret, 1881 g
 Geocoris aethiopicus Montandon, 1913 g
 Geocoris aethiops Distant, 1901 g
 Geocoris alboclavus Barber, 1949 i g
 Geocoris amabilis Stal, 1855 g
 Geocoris anticus Pericart, 1994 g
 Geocoris apertus Kerzhner, 1979 g
 Geocoris arenarius (Jakovlev, 1867) g
 Geocoris asetosus Malipatil, 1994 g
 Geocoris aspasia Linnavuori, 1972 g
 Geocoris ater (Fabricius, 1787) g
 Geocoris atricolor Montandon, 1908 i g b
 Geocoris barberi Readio and Sweet, 1982 i g
 Geocoris barrosi Porter, 1917 g
 Geocoris beameri Barber, 1935 i g
 Geocoris bengalensis Mukhopadhyay & Ghosh, 1982 g
 Geocoris borealis Malipatil, 1994 g
 Geocoris bullatus (Say, 1832) i g b  (large big-eyed bug)
 Geocoris callosulus Berg, 1879 g
 Geocoris cardinalis Puton, 1874 g
 Geocoris carinatus McAtee, 1914 i g
 Geocoris caspiriensis Montandon, 1913 g
 Geocoris chinai Kiritshenko, 1931 g
 Geocoris chinensis Jakovlev, 1904 g
 Geocoris chloroticus Puton, 1888 g
 Geocoris collaris Puton, 1878 g
 Geocoris confalonierii (de Bergevin, 1932) g
 Geocoris danalicus Linnavuori, 1978 g
 Geocoris davisi Barber, 1935 i g
 Geocoris decoratus Uhler, 1877 i g
 Geocoris deficiens Lethierry, 1881 g
 Geocoris desertorum (Jakovlev, 1871) g
 Geocoris discopterus Stal, 1874 i g b
 Geocoris dispar (Waga, 1839) g
 Geocoris disparatus Johnson & Fox, 1892 g
 Geocoris dubreuili Montandon, 1909 g
 Geocoris duzeei Montandon, 1908 i g
 Geocoris elegantulus Distant, 1904 g
 Geocoris erebus Distant, 1918 g
 Geocoris ernstheissi Carapezza, 2006 g
 Geocoris erythrocephalus (Lepelitier & Serville, 1825) g
 Geocoris erythrops (Dufour, 1857) g
 Geocoris fedtschenkoi Reuter, 1885 g
 Geocoris figuratus (Amyot & Serville, 1843) g
 Geocoris flaviceps (Burmeister, 1834) g
 Geocoris flavilineus Stål, 1874 i g
 Geocoris flavipes Stal, 1854 g
 Geocoris floridanus Blatchley, 1926 i g b  (Florida big-eyed bug)
 Geocoris frisoni Barber, 1926 i g b
 Geocoris grylloides (Linnaeus, 1761) i g
 Geocoris hirsutus Montandon, 1907 g
 Geocoris hirticornis (Jakovlev, 1881) g
 Geocoris hispidulus Puton, 1874 g
 Geocoris howardi Montandon, 1908 i g b
 Geocoris hui Zheng & Zou, 1987 g
 Geocoris hyalinus (Fieber, 1861) g
 Geocoris infernorum Scudder, 1890 g
 Geocoris insularis China, 1955 g
 Geocoris jucundus (Fieber, 1861) g
 Geocoris junodi Montandon, 1907 g
 Geocoris kalighatus Distant, 1910 g
 Geocoris lapponicus Zetterstedt, 1838 g
 Geocoris leopoldi Schouteden, 1933 g
 Geocoris limbatellus Horvath, 1895 g
 Geocoris limbatus Stal, 1874 i g b
 Geocoris lineola (Rambur, 1839) g
 Geocoris linnavuorii Pericart, 1994 g
 Geocoris liolestes Hesse, 1947 g
 Geocoris lituratus (Fieber, 1844) g
 Geocoris lividipennis Stål, 1862 i g
 Geocoris lubrus Kirkaldy, 1907 g
 Geocoris luridus (Fieber, 1844) g
 Geocoris lutulentus Distant, 1918 g
 Geocoris lynceus Lindberg, 1924 g
 Geocoris maindroni Montandon, 1907 g
 Geocoris marduk Linnavuori, 1984 g
 Geocoris megacephalus (Rossi, 1790) g
 Geocoris membranaeus (Montrouzier, 1861) g
 Geocoris minusculus Kerzhner & Josifov, 1966 g
 Geocoris moderatus Montandon, 1907 g
 Geocoris modestus (Fieber, 1861) g
 Geocoris mongolicus Horvath, 1901 g
 Geocoris montandoniellus Kiritshenko, 1916 g
 Geocoris montanus Zheng & Zou, 1981 g
 Geocoris nanus Barber, 1835 i g
 Geocoris nebulosus (Montandon, 1907) g
 Geocoris ningal Linnavuori, 1984 g
 Geocoris nocturnus Linnavuori, 1978 g
 Geocoris ochraceus (Fieber, 1861) g
 Geocoris ochropterus (Fieber, 1844) g
 Geocoris omani Barber, 1935 i g
 Geocoris ornatus (Fieber, 1861) g
 Geocoris oschanini (Jakovlev, 1871) g
 Geocoris pallens Stal, 1854 i b  (western big-eyed bug)
 Geocoris pallidiceps Stal, 1858 g
 Geocoris pallidicornis Kerzhner, 1979 g
 Geocoris pallidipennis (A. Costa, 1843) g
 Geocoris pallipes Stal, 1859 g
 Geocoris pattakumensis Kiritshenko, 1914 g
 Geocoris paulus McAtee, 1914 i g
 Geocoris pedunculatus (Harris, 1835) g
 Geocoris phaeopterus (Germar, 1838)
 Geocoris piligerus Linnavuori, 1978 g
 Geocoris plagiatus (Fieber, 1844) g
 Geocoris proteus Distant, 1883 g
 Geocoris provisus Bergroth, 1895 g
 Geocoris pseudolineolus Linnavuori, 1978 g
 Geocoris pseudolituratus Mukhopadhyay & Ghosh, 1982 g
 Geocoris pubescens (Jakovlev, 1871) g
 Geocoris pulchricornis Linnavuori, 1960 g
 Geocoris pulvisculatus Distant, 1904 g
 Geocoris punctipes (Say, 1832) i g b  (big-eye bug)
 Geocoris puri Distant, 1910 g
 Geocoris putonianus (Bergroth, 1892) g
 Geocoris quercicola Linnavuori, 1962 g
 Geocoris ruficeps (Germar, 1837) g
 Geocoris rufipennis Distant, 1918 g
 Geocoris rutiloides Distant, 1918 g
 Geocoris rutilus Distant, 1904 g
 Geocoris scitus (Fieber, 1861) g
 Geocoris scudderi Stål, 1874 i g
 Geocoris sjostedti Montandon, 1908 g
 Geocoris sobrinus (Blanchard, 1852) g
 Geocoris sokotranus Kirkaldy, 1899 g
 Geocoris spinolae (Montrouzier, 1865) g
 Geocoris stellatus (Montandon, 1907) g
 Geocoris striolus (Fieber, 1861) g
 Geocoris succineus Royer, 1923 g
 Geocoris superbus (Montandon, 1907) g
 Geocoris tenuatus Hesse, 1925 g
 Geocoris thoracicus (Fieber, 1861) i g
 Geocoris titan Linnavouri, 1986 g
 Geocoris toposa Linnavuori, 1978 g
 Geocoris uliginosus (Say, 1832) i g b
 Geocoris unicolor (Eckerlein & Wagner, 1965) g
 Geocoris variabilis Jakovlev, 1890 g
 Geocoris varipes Distant, 1918 g
 Geocoris varius (Uhler, 1860) g
 Geocoris ventralis (Fieber, 1861) g
 Geocoris vestitulus Schouteden, 1957 g
 Geocoris vestitus Distant, 1901 g
 Geocoris victoriensis Malipatil, 1994 g
 Geocoris walkeri Lethierry & Severin, 1894 g
 Geocoris willeyi Kirkaldy, 1905 g
 Geocoris woodwardi Malipatil, 1994 g

Data sources: i = ITIS, c = Catalogue of Life, g = GBIF, b = Bugguide.net

References

Geocoris